The otuhaka (: row-of-dancemovements) is a traditional Tongan group dance with prominent Sāmoan influence wherein the performers are seated and make gestures with their arms only, with some accentuation from head and body.

Originally the otuhaka was performed by older, chiefly ladies only, who were supposed to be too old to stand. Very often a otuhaka was followed by an ula performed by their (standing) daughters or any young, chiefly ladies. In another respect, the 'Otuhaka was believed to be performed early in the morning to wake the King in a peaceful and subtle way. The performers sat crosslegged on the ground in a half circle with the guest of honour (the chief to whom they wanted to give homage) at the centre. Like the māuluulu part of the performance is on the beat of the music only, part of it is with additional singing of a chorus. The music by tradition, consists of beating with sticks on the tafua, bamboos, which are rolled up in a mat, just to keep the beat.

Nowadays the otuhaka can be performed by men and women of any rank, but as dance it is decidedly less popular than its successor the māuluulu, as the words and the dance movements are prescribed by tradition. Yet every dance master who is conducting this dance has a different version which he will claim is the right one from ancient times. The people from Lapaha may have the strongest claim, as they are the guardians of the Tui Tonga traditions.

Lyrics
The words of the several verses are largely archaic and since they are derived from Samoan origin some are not well understood by their Tongan performers. Several older parts seem to have to do with seafaring. A few example verses.

A quite recent example, in modern Tongan:

A verse in old Sāmoan, expressing grief about the death of the spiritual king of Tonga:

A verse in old Sāmoan. For Tongans Anilai and Siulafata may be names of unknown persons, but in Sāluafata harbour on Upolu was an important stopover in ancient times:

A verse in modern Sāmoan, a quite recent addition as it talks about the annexation of Tutuila by the Americans (sailors= US Navy) in 1900:

References

 Tonga history association conference; 1993

Tongan culture
Dances of Tonga